Aradhana is a 1969 Indian Hindi romantic drama film directed by Shakti Samanta, starring Sharmila Tagore and Rajesh Khanna. It won the Filmfare Award for Best Film at the 17th Filmfare Awards. Tagore won her only Filmfare Best Actress Award.  Originally released in Hindi and dubbed in Bengali, Aradhanas huge success led to two remakes: the Tamil film Sivagamiyin Selvan (1974) and the Telugu film Kannavari Kalalu (1974). This film is counted among the 17 consecutive hit films of Rajesh Khanna between 1969 and 1971, by adding the two hero films Marayada and Andaz to the 15 consecutive solo hits he gave from 1969 to 1971. Aradhana was a blockbuster in India and the Soviet Union. The theme of the movie was based on the 1946 film To Each His Own.

Plot 
In Darjeeling, West Bengal, Indian Air Force officer Arun Varma sings "Mere Sapno Ki Rani" atop an open jeep along with his co-pilot Madan, while Vandana, the daughter of a doctor Gopal Tripathi demurely sneaks glances at him from a mini train. After a brief romance, they wed in a temple without rituals and with only God as a witness. After which it starts raining and they have to stay in a hotel, and sleep with each other. This is where Vandana becomes pregnant.

Soon afterward, Arun dies in an air crash. His family refuses to accept the unwed Vandana since her marriage with Arun was never formalised. Meanwhile, her father also dies, leaving her destitute. Vandana's son is finally born, she puts him up for adoption so that she can legally adopt him the next day but she is forced to let a childless couple adopt him. Determined to be a part of his life, she accepts the responsibility of becoming his nanny. The boy is named Suraj. Her employer's brother-in-law Shyam arrives and lusts for Vandana. He tries to rape her when no one is around, but Suraj arrives and stabs him to death to save Vandana. When the police arrive, Vandana takes the blame for the murder and is arrested while Suraj runs away and forgets this mishap as he grows up.

Several years later, when Vandana is released from jail, she is befriended by the jailor who takes her home and introduces her to his daughter Renu. Vandana comes face to face with Suraj(who looks just like his father) when she discovers that Renu is dating him. Suraj, just like how his father wished, is an air-force officer. He slowly starts remembering that he has seen Vandana somewhere, although Vandana wants to hide the truth as she feels Suraj may be embarrassed upon realising his parents' background and history. Vandana makes herself at home at the jailor's house.

Suraj is injured in an air crash like his real father Arun but survives. While he is recuperating in the hospital, Vandana meets Madan, who knows that Suraj is Arun and Vandana's son. He wants to tell Suraj the truth, but Vandana does not want Suraj to know that he is her son, fearing the consequences. Later when Vandana is not around, Suraj sees her diary where Arun's photo is found. Realising that Arun and Vandana are his true parents, he salutes Vandana's self-sacrificing attitude and acknowledges her publicly as his mother.

Cast 
 Sharmila Tagore as Vandana Verma / Vandana Tripathi (Arun's Widow)
 Rajesh Khanna as Flight Lieutenant Arun Verma / Suraj Kumar Verma / Suraj Kumar Saxena (Double Role)
 Sujit Kumar as Air Commodore Madan Verma
 Ashok Kumar as Air Commodore Ganguli (Retd)
 Pahari Sanyal as Gopal Tripathi
 Anita Guha as Mrs. Prasad Saxena
 Abhi Bhattacharya as Ram Prasad Saxena
Manmohan - Shyam
 Madan Puri as the Jailor
 Asit Sen as Tikaram
 Farida Jalal as Renu Verma (Suraj's Wife) 
 Subhash Ghai as Flight Lieutenant Prakash (Suraj's colleague and friend)
Krishna Kant as Mr. Verma (Arun's Father)

Production 
The film was scripted by Sachin Bhowmick.  The theme of the movie was based on the 1946 film To Each His Own. A day prior to the shooting of Aradhana, producer Surinder Kapoor showed Samanta his latest film, Ek Shrimaan Ek Shrimati with Shashi Kapoor as the lead, which was also written by Sachin Bhowmick. Much to his surprise, this film had a similar ending to his own film. The following day, Samanta decided to scrap his film, when writers Gulshan Nanda and Madhusudan Kalelkar visited his office. Upon hearing the issue, it was Gulshan Nanda who suggested to have a double role of father and son in the film. Originally, the first hero was to die by the interval and a new hero was to step in. The same evening, while Aradhana was being cancelled, Nanda recited a story of Kati Patang to Samanta, which he instantly liked, so for the next couple of hours they first rewrote the second half of Aradhana, and subsequently went on to discuss Kati Patang. The "Roop Tera Mastana" song sequence, which lasted more than three minutes and 30 seconds, was filmed in a single take. Sharmila Tagore believes this was done due to time constraints. Shakti Samanta reminisces in an interview that he suggested to Rajesh Khanna that he mimic Devanand in his second role as a son. He did and it clicked.

Soundtrack 

The soundtrack of the film was composed by S. D. Burman, with lyrics by Anand Bakshi. Sachin Dev Burman had written the music for the songs of Aradhana with his son, Rahul Dev Burman, and completed the recording of the songs in the voices of Kishore Kumar, Lata Mangeshkar, Asha Bhonsle, Mohd. Rafi and S.D. Burman himself.

In "Roop Tera Mastana", Kersi Lord played the accordion, Homi Mullan played the duggi and Manohari Singh played the saxophone. This track was also reused in Tamil Remix Version as "Jean Pants" sung by K.S. Chithra and Stylebhai.

Awards 
 17th Filmfare Awards:
Won

 Best Film – Shakti Samanta
 Best Actress – Sharmila Tagore
 Best Male Playback Singer – Kishore Kumar for "Roop Tera Mastana"

Nominated

 Best Director – Shakti Samanta
 Best Actor – Rajesh Khanna
 Best Supporting Actress – Farida Jalal
 Best Music Director – S. D. Burman
 Best Lyricist – Anand Bakshi for "Mere Sapno Ki Rani"
 Best Story – Sachin Bhowmick

Box office 
Aradhana estimated worldwide gross: .

India:  in 1969.

Soviet Union: 11.85 million Rbls ($14.29 million, 108.5 million) in 1972.

In terms of estimated box office footfalls, it sold  ticket sales in India and  tickets in the Soviet Union, for a combined  tickets sold worldwide.

Impact 
Aradhana had a large impact on Indians in general. It inspired many to take up films as a vocation, one of them being the popular Indian actor Tom Alter, who confessed in an interview that he headed to Film and Television Institute of India after being impressed watching Rajesh Khanna in Aradhana in 1970.

Notes

References

External links 
 
 The Aradhna Syndrome

1969 films
1960s Hindi-language films
Films scored by S. D. Burman
Indian aviation films
1969 romantic drama films
Films directed by Shakti Samanta
Films set in Darjeeling
Hindi films remade in other languages
Indian Air Force in films
Indian romantic drama films
Films with screenplays by Sachin Bhowmick
Indian remakes of American films